The New Zealand pipit (Anthus novaeseelandiae) is a fairly small passerine bird of open country in New Zealand and outlying islands. It belongs to the pipit genus Anthus in the family Motacillidae.

It was formerly lumped together with the Richard's, African, Mountain and Paddyfield pipits in a single species: Richard's pipit, Anthus novaeseelandiae. Many authors split the Australasian pipit further into two species: Australian pipit (Anthus australis) in Australia and New Guinea and New Zealand pipit (Anthus novaeseelandiae), also called pihoihoi, in New Zealand.

Description
It is a slender bird, 16 to 19 cm long, and weighs about 40 grams. The plumage is pale brown above with dark streaks. The underparts are pale with streaks on the breast. There is a pale stripe over the eye and dark malar and moustachial stripes. The long tail has white outer-feathers and is often wagged up and down. The legs are long and pinkish-brown while the bill is slender and brownish.

Ecology
It is a bird of open habitats such as grassland, farmland, roadsides, dry river beds, sand dunes and open woodland. It forages on the ground for small invertebrates such as beetles, spiders and insect larvae. It will also eat seeds such as those of grasses.

The birds' numbers have declined in parts of New Zealand due to the improvement of pastures, use of pesticides and predation by introduced species.

Subspecies

A number of subspecies are recognised:

A. n. novaeseelandiae - North, South and Stewart Islands (birds on the North Island are sometimes treated as a separate subspecies A. n. reischeki).
A. n. aucklandicus - Auckland Islands & Campbell Islands
A. n. chathamensis - Chatham Islands
A. n. steindachneri - Antipodes Islands

Gallery

References

 Heather, Barrie D. & Robertson, Hugh (1996) The Field Guide to the Birds of New Zealand

Anthus
Birds of Oceania
Australasian pipit
Australasian pipit